The Sun is the star at the center of the Solar System.

The Sun may also refer to:

Publications

United Kingdom 
 The Sun (United Kingdom), a current daily national tabloid
 The Sun (1792–1876), a defunct British newspaper 
 The Sun (1893–1906), a defunct British newspaper

United States 
 The Sun (magazine), a monthly literary and photography magazine
 The Sun (Lowell), a daily newspaper in Massachusetts
 The Sun (New York City), a defunct daily newspaper in New York (1833–1950)
 The New York Sun, 2002–2008
 The Baltimore Sun, Baltimore's newspaper of record
 The Sun (Sheridan), a defunct weekly newspaper in Oregon (1890–2014)
 Sun, later the Ann Arbor Sun, a defunct underground newspaper in Michigan
 The Sun, later called Peck's Sun, a Wisconsin newspaper founded by George Wilbur Peck
 The U.S. Sun, the U.S. online edition of The Sun (United Kingdom)

Elsewhere 
Sun Newspapers (Northern Territory), community newspapers in Darwin, Australia
The Sun (Hong Kong), a defunct Chinese-language newspaper (1999–2016)
 The SUN (Hong Kong), an English-language newspaper for Filipinos
 The Sun (Malaysia), a daily Malaysian tabloid
 The Sun (New Zealand), a defunct New Zealand newspaper
 The Sun (Nigeria), a daily Nigerian newspaper
 The Sun (Rangoon), a defunct Burmese newspaper (1911–1954)
 The Sun (Sydney), a defunct Australian tabloid (1910–1988)
 The Toronto Sun (Canada), started in 1971 as newspaper print, famous for the weekly backpage Sunshine Girl models. Still in daily production.

Arts and entertainment

Films 
 The Sun (film), a 2005 Russian biographical film about Japanese Emperor Hirohito

Music

Artists 
 The Sun (American band)
 The Sun (Estonian band)

Albums 
 The Sun (Cat Empire album)
 The Sun (Fridge album)
 The Sun, an album by FanFan

Songs 
 The Sun (song), a 2013 song by Demy and Alex Leon
 "The Sun", by Maroon 5 from the 2002 album Songs About Jane
 "The Sun", a 2014 single by Parov Stelar
 "The Sun", an original Barney song from Barney in Outer Space
 "I. The Sun", by the Microphones from Mount Eerie

Fictional and literary uses 
 The Sun (Tarot card), a trump card in the tarot deck
 The Sun (wordless novel), a 1919 book of woodcut prints by Frans Masereel
 Ash-Shams ("The Sun"), the ninety-first sura of the Qur'an
 The Sun, a The House of the Dead III character

Other 
 The Sun (St. Paul's Churchyard), a historical bookseller in London

See also 
 Sun (disambiguation)
 Sun (newspaper)
 The Sunday Sun (disambiguation), name of various newspapers
 Le Soleil (French for "The Sun"), name of various newspapers
 Die Son (Afrikaans for "The Sun"), a daily South African tabloid